Sára Ryggshamar Nysted (born 19 January 2001) is a Faroese swimmer. She competed in the women's 200 and 400 metre individual medley event at the 2017 World Aquatics Championships.

References

2001 births
Living people
Faroese female swimmers
Place of birth missing (living people)
Female medley swimmers